92.3 Magik FM (DWCK 92.3 MHz) is an FM station owned and operated by Century Broadcasting Network. Its studios and transmitter are located at A&S Bldg., P. Gomez St., Laoag.

See also
 Century Broadcasting Network

References

Radio stations in Ilocos Norte